Xanthippus is the name of:

 Xanthippus (father of Pericles), was a wealthy Athenian of the 5th century BC, and father of Pericles
 Xanthippus (son of Pericles) (d. 429 BC), one of the sons of Pericles and grandson of the above
 Xanthippus (Spartan commander), a 3rd century BC Spartan general who fought for Carthage during the First Punic war
 Xanthippus (grasshopper), a genus of band-winged grasshopper